Tectonic plate interactions are classified into three basic types:

 Divergent boundaries are areas where plates move away from each other, forming either mid-ocean ridges or rift valleys. These are also known as constructive boundaries.
 Convergent boundaries are areas where plates move toward each other and collide. These are also known as compressional or destructive boundaries.
 Subduction zones occur where an oceanic plate meets a continental plate and is pushed underneath it. Subduction zones are marked by oceanic trenches.  The descending end of the oceanic plate melts and creates pressure in the mantle, causing volcanoes to form.
 Obduction occurs when the continental plate is pushed under the oceanic plate, but this is unusual as the relative densities of the tectonic plates favours subduction of the oceanic plate. This causes the oceanic plate to buckle and usually results in a new mid-ocean ridge forming and turning the obduction into subduction.
 Orogenic belts occur where two continental plates collide and push upwards to form large mountain ranges. These are also known as collision boundaries.
 Transform boundaries occur when two plates grind past each other with only limited convergent or divergent activity.

Divergent boundaries

 The East African Rift (Great Rift Valley) in eastern Africa
 The Mid-Atlantic Ridge system separates the North American Plate and South American Plate in the west from the Eurasian Plate and African Plate in the east
 The Gakkel Ridge is a slow spreading ridge located in the Arctic Ocean
 The East Pacific Rise, extending from the South Pacific to the Gulf of California
 The Baikal Rift Zone in eastern Russia
 The Red Sea Rift
 The Aden Ridge along the southern shore of the Arabian Peninsula
 The Carlsberg Ridge in the eastern Indian Ocean
 The Gorda Ridge off the northwest coast of North America
 The Explorer Ridge off the northwest coast of North America
 The Juan de Fuca Ridge off the northwest coast of North America
 The Chile Rise off the southeast Pacific

Convergent boundaries (subduction zones)

 The oceanic Nazca Plate subducts beneath the continental South American Plate at the Peru–Chile Trench.
 Just north of the Nazca Plate, the oceanic Cocos Plate subducts under the Caribbean Plate and forms the Middle America Trench.
 The Cascadia subduction zone is where the oceanic Juan de Fuca, Gorda and Explorer Plates subduct under the continental North American plate.
 The oceanic Pacific Plate subducts under the North American Plate (composed of both continental and oceanic sections) forming the Aleutian Trench.
 The oceanic Pacific Plate subducts beneath the continental Okhotsk Plate at the Japan Trench.
 The oceanic Philippine Sea Plate subducts beneath the Eurasian Plate at the Ryukyu Trench.
 The oceanic Pacific Plate subducts under the oceanic Philippine Sea Plate forming the Mariana Trench.
 The oceanic Philippine Sea Plate is subducting under the Philippine Mobile Belt forming the Philippine Trench and the East Luzon Trench.
 The Eurasian Plate is subducting under the Philippine Mobile Belt at the Manila Trench.
 The Sunda Plate is subducting under the Philippine Mobile Belt at the Negros Trench and the Cotobato Trench.
 The oceanic Indo-Australian Plate is subducted beneath the continental Sunda Plate along the Sunda Trench.
 The oceanic Pacific Plate is subducting under the Indo-Australian Plate north and east of New Zealand, but the direction of subduction reverses south of the Alpine Fault where the Indo-Australian Plate starts subducting under the Pacific Plate.
The South American Plate is subducting under the South Sandwich Plate, forming the South Sandwich Trench.
The oceanic Indo-Australian Plate is subducting underneath the New Hebrides Plate forming the New Hebrides Trench.

Orogenic belts

 The most dramatic orogenic belt on the planet is the one between the Indo-Australian Plate and African Plate on one side (to the South) and the Eurasian Plate on the other side (to the North). This belt runs from New Zealand in the East-SouthEast, through Indonesia, along the Himalayas, through the Middle East up to the Mediterranean in the West-Northwest. It is also called the "Tethyan" Zone, as it constitutes the zone along which the ancient Tethys Ocean was deformed and disappeared. The following mountain belts can be distinguished:
 The European Alps
 The Carpathians
 The Pyrenees
 The Apennines
 The Dinarides
 The North African mountain belts such as the Atlas Mountains
 The Karst Plateau of the Balkan Peninsula
 The Caucasus
 The Zagros
 The Himalayas
 The Indonesian Archipelago
 The Southern Alps of New Zealand
The Andes orogenic belt is the latest of a series of orogenies along the western margin of the South American Plate.

Transform boundaries

 The San Andreas Fault in California is an active transform boundary.  The Pacific Plate (carrying the city of Los Angeles) is moving northwards with respect to the North American Plate.
 The Queen Charlotte Fault on the Pacific Northwest coast of North America
 The Motagua Fault, which crosses through Guatemala, is a transform boundary between the southern edge of the North American Plate and the northern edge of the Caribbean Plate.
 New Zealand's Alpine Fault is another active transform boundary.
 The Dead Sea Transform (DST) fault which runs through the Jordan River Valley in the Middle East.
 The Owen Fracture Zone along the southeastern boundary of the Arabian Plate.
 The  East Anatolian and  North Anatolian faults run across much of Turkey and cause large and deadly earthquakes such as the 1999 Izmit earthquake

See also

References